The Prelude and Fugue in G-sharp minor, BWV 887, is the eighteenth prelude and fugue in the second volume of The Well-Tempered Clavier by Johann Sebastian Bach. It was written in 1738.

Prelude

The prelude is in common time and has 50 measures. It is primarily made up of sixteenth notes and eighth notes. It has many accidentals.

Fugue
It is made up mostly of eighth notes, quarter notes, dotted quarter notes, and sixteenth notes.

References

The Well-Tempered Clavier
1738 compositions
Compositions in G-sharp minor